Brick Chapel is an unincorporated community in Monroe Township, Putnam County, in the U.S. state of Indiana.

History
A post office called Brick Chapel was established in 1873, and was discontinued in 1905. The community took its name from the nearby Brick Chapel church.

Geography

References

Unincorporated communities in Putnam County, Indiana
Unincorporated communities in Indiana